William Campion was an English politician in the 16th Century.

Rythe was born in London. He was educated at Pembroke College, Oxford. and was M.P. for Haslemere from 1586 to 1587.

References

People from London
Year of birth missing
Year of death missing
English MPs 1586–1587
Alumni of Pembroke College, Cambridge